Abdullah Abu Zaitoun (born 17 September 1991) is a Jordanian professional footballer who plays as a midfielder.

References

External links
 

Jordanian footballers
Jordan international footballers
Association football goalkeepers
Living people
Al-Hussein SC (Irbid) players
Shabab Al-Hussein SC players
Ma'an SC players
Al-Ramtha SC players
That Ras Club players
Jordanian Pro League players
1991 births